Simon Clark (born 20 August 1960) is a British television sports presenter and correspondent primarily on the television programme, Look North.

Before 2002 he worked for the BBC in Leeds and listeners in South Yorkshire remember him as the sports presenter for BBC Radio Sheffield.   He worked there from 1991 to 1997. He also broadcast at Radio Hallam FM from 1988 to 1991 having started his career in the late 1970s at Kingstown Radio. before moving onto Viking Radio in Hull when it launched in 1984.

In 1994 he had his first daughter shortly followed by the second in 1998.

In 2006 he hosted a pre-match event before every FIFA World Cup game involving England, at the BBC Big Screen in Hull. His reports can occasionally be heard on Final Score, BBC One's football results programme, on every Saturday during the football season.

He reported from the 2009 Barclays Asia Trophy in Beijing where Tottenham Hotspur beat Hull City 3–0 in the final.

In the lead up to the 2012 Olympic Games in London, Simon Clark has been reporting on the athletes, torch relay and occasions related to the event in Yorkshire and Lincolnshire. He also worked on BBC School Report from the organisation's base in Salford.

Simon Clark began his working life in business, where he ran a successful travel agency before moving into the world of media.

He lists travel as one of his passions. That list also includes refereeing in the Hull Boys Sunday Football League when not reporting on BBC Look North.

References

External links
Simon Clark bio at Look North
Simon Clark BBC Sheffield
Simon Clark's history of Hull FC

1960 births
Living people
People from Kingston upon Hull
British television journalists